I Not Stupid Too is a Singaporean TV series adaptation and the sequel of the hit film I Not Stupid Too. The series debuted in September 2006 and was aired on Saturdays at 9pm.

Director Jack Neo reprises his role as Mr Yeo. Original cast members Xiang Yun, Shawn Lee and Joshua Ang return for the television series.

Plot
The series continues from the events in the film, with a time lapse in between. Similar to the film, Jerry Yeo introduces the characters and the situation. Chengcai and Tom are now in Secondary 4. Mr Yeo has been stationed in Shanghai for two years while Mrs Yeo has since quit her full-time job and taken up part-time work as a freelance reporter so she can spend more time with her family.

After his father dies, Chengcai returns to school determined to study hard so as to not let his father down. He decides to rent his flat out to earn some extra money. Tom invites him to stay at his house. Knowing his mother will disapprove due to Chengcai's past, Tom and his younger brother Jerry get  friends to help and they devise a creative and elaborate plan to get their mother to agree. Mrs Yeo eventually welcomes Chengcai into their family after he rescues them from a robber.

In school, Tom and Chengcai are popular students and are often chased by their female schoolmates. Eventually they realize that they both have a crush on the same classmate, Jing Jing, and their friendship is put to the test. Meanwhile, their English teacher, Miss Tan, falls for the Phys Ed teacher, Mr Hao, who seeks help from Mr Fu and Chengcai in dealing with his shyness.

Chengcai's guardian, Lady Boss, often visits the Yeo family. She feeds Granny with speculations of how Mrs Yeo and Mr Fu may be having an affair. A small upheaval takes place which is thankfully resolved with the help from the children.

Cast

Main 
 Shawn Lee as Tom Yeo 杨学谦
 Lee Jiaxun 李佳勳 as Jerry Yeo 杨学强: Ashley Leong played Jerry Yeo in the original film but was replaced by Lee for the television series.
 Joshua Ang as Lim Chengcai 林成才
 Xiang Yun as Mrs Yeo 许秀梅
 Ng Suan Loi binti Jingjing 黄晶晶 as Granny "Ah ma"
 Asmiyati binti Asbah as Yati

Supporting and Recurring 
 Nick Shen as Hao Letian
 Johnny Ng 黄家强 as Fu Dabing
 Jaime Teo 赵彩菱 as Miss Tan
 Natalli Ong 爱雯 as Jing Jing 晶晶
 Tan Yong Ming 陈勇铭 as Fatty 小胖
 Liu Lingling 刘玲玲 as "Lady Boss" 肥阿姨
 Jack Neo as Mr Yeo

Production
Like the previous film I Not Stupid, a sitcom version of the original film was written and produced. Filming took place in River Valley Primary School, Kranji Secondary School and other locations during school holidays.

While the original film focused more on the protagonists' relationships with their families, the series focuses on some of the other everyday idiosyncrasies of a teenager's life such as crushes, addiction to mobile phones, sibling rivalry, and friendship. The boys have also matured since the events in the film and have a better relationship with their teachers, especially Mr Fu. In general the series is more light-hearted than the film, and relies on an episodic structure.

References

External links
 I Not Stupid Too official website
 I Not Stupid Too (Chinese) on MediaCorp

2006 Singaporean television series debuts
2006 Singaporean television series endings
2000s Singaporean television series
Mandarin-language television shows
Singapore Chinese dramas
Channel 8 (Singapore) original programming